Turriplicifer australis is a species of sea snail, a marine gastropod mollusk, in the family Costellariidae, the ribbed miters.

Description
The length of the shell attains 37.7 mm.

The smooth shell is polished. It is brown, with a broad yellowish band stained with chestnut.

Distribution
This marine species is endemic to Australia: South Australia, Tasmania, Victoria, Western Australia.

References

  Swainson, W. 1820. Zoological Illustrations, or original figures and descriptions of new, rare, or interesting animals, selected chiefly from the classes of ornithology, entomology, and conchology, and arranged according to their natural affinities. Vol. 1. London : Baldwin & Craddock 1st Series pls 1–18. 
 Quoy, J.R.C. & Gaimard, J.P. 1833. Voyage de découvertes de l'Astrolabe, exécuté par ordre du Roi, pendant les années 1826-1829. Paris : J. Tastu Zoologie Vol. 2 pp. 321-686. 
 Sowerby, G.B. (2nd) 1874. Mongraph of the genus Mitra. 1-46, pls 352-379 in Thesaurus Conchyliorum, or monographs of genera of shells. London : Sowerby Vol. 4. 
 Verco, J.C. 1896. Descriptions of new species of marine Mollusca of South Australia. Part I. Transactions of the Royal Society of South Australia 20: 217-232 
 Turner H. 2001. Katalog der Familie Costellariidae Macdonald, 1860. Conchbooks. 1–100 page(s): 18

External links
 Swainson, W. (1820-1823). Zoological Illustrations, or, original figures and descriptions of new, rare, or interesting animals, selected chiefly from the classes of ornithology, entomology, and conchology, and arranged on the principles of Cuvier and other modern zoologists. London: Baldwin, Cradock & Joe; Strand: W. Wood. (Vol. 1-3): pl. 1-18
 Verco, J. C. (1896). Descriptions of new species of marine Mollusca of South Australia. Transactions of the Royal Society of South Australia. 20: 217-232, pls 6-8.,
 Fedosov A.E., Puillandre N., Herrmann M., Dgebuadze P. & Bouchet P. (2017). Phylogeny, systematics, and evolution of the family Costellariidae (Gastropoda: Neogastropoda). Zoological Journal of the Linnean Society. 179(3): 541-626.

Costellariidae
Gastropods described in 1820
Gastropods of Australia